Jorge Jukich (born 6 January 1943) is a former Uruguayan cyclist. He competed at the 1968 Summer Olympics and the 1972 Summer Olympics.

References

External links
 

1943 births
Living people
Uruguayan male cyclists
Olympic cyclists of Uruguay
Cyclists at the 1968 Summer Olympics
Cyclists at the 1972 Summer Olympics
Sportspeople from Montevideo